Future interests is the subset of actuarial math that divides enjoyment of property -- usually the right to an income stream either from an annuity, a trust, royalties, or rents -- based usually on the future survival of one or more persons (natural humans, not juridical persons such as corporations).

Actuarial science